Kristi Lynn Addis Hickman is an American actress, journalism, athlete and beauty queen who was crowned Miss Teen USA 1987.

Biography
Hickman was named Miss Mississippi Teen USA 1987 and went on to win the Miss Teen USA title on July 21, 1987, in El Paso, Texas. She remains today as the only Miss Teen USA pageant winner from Mississippi. She remained in school during her year as Miss Teen USA and traveled on weekends and holidays, advocating for Nancy Reagan's "Just Say No" program in schools.  As Miss Teen USA she received prizes worth $150,000, attended a festival in Acapulco and received a part in the television series The New Gidget.

In high school Addis was a point guard on the three-time state championship-winning basketball team and was one of Mississippi's best high school mile runners.  She won six national championship twirling titles and was picked compete in a potential twirling team for the 1984 Summer Olympics. After holding the Miss Teen USA title Addis attended the University of Mississippi in Oxford, Mississippi. She graduated with a degree in broadcast journalism and was the feature baton twirler for the "Pride of the South" marching band in the 1989, 1990, and 1991 seasons. After various forays in acting and broadcast work, she became a born again Christian in 1996. She is involved with an International Church of Christ women's ministry outside Atlanta, Georgia.

References

External links 
 

Living people
1971 births
Miss Teen USA winners
People from Grenada County, Mississippi
University of Mississippi alumni